The 2019 4 Hours of Shanghai was an endurance sportscar racing event held on 10 November 2019, as the third round of the 2019-20 FIA World Endurance Championship. This was the inaugural running of the race, in a four-hour format, having previously been run as the 6 Hours of Shanghai. The race was won overall by Bruno Senna, Gustavo Menezes, and Norman Nato, in the #1 Rebellion Racing Rebellion R13, with the race being the first win on the road for a non hybrid LMP1 since the first ever WEC race, the 2012 12 Hours of Sebring.

Background 
The provisional calendar for the 2019–20 FIA World Endurance Championship was unveiled at the 2018 6 Hours of Silverstone, featuring eight races, on five continents, starting at Silverstone in September 2019 with a four-hour race, and ending with the Le Mans 24 Hours in June 2020. It was noted that for first time in the FIA World Endurance Championship, 4 hour races would be introduced, at the Silverstone Circuit, and the Shanghai International Circuit, following a fan survey which was conducted by the championship despite an overwhelming preference being shown for 6 hour, 12 hour, and 24 hour races.

Entry list 
The entry list for the race was released on 10 October 2019, with 31 cars being split across the four classes. All five full-season LMP1 entries were listed, alongside 8 LMP2s, 6 GTE-Pro cars, and 12 cars in GTE-Am, with GTE Am having the #78 Proton Competition Porsche 911 RSR as an additional entry. Majority of the driving seats were displayed as being filled, with the exception of both Team LNT Ginetta G60-LT-P1s, which had no drivers, and the #88 Dempsey-Proton Racing, which had 2 empty seats. A 2nd entry list was released on 23 October 2019, with the Team LNT Ginetta seats being filled, with all drivers from the previous race returning, with the exception of Luca Ghiotto, who was replaced by Jordan King. On November 7, 2019, Will Bamber was announced to be driving in the #88 Dempsey-Proton Racing, alongside Thomas Preining.

Qualifying

Qualifying Results 
Pole position winners in each class are marked in bold.

Race

Race Result 
The minimum number of laps for classification (70% of the overall winning car's race distance) was 88 laps. Class winners in bold.

References 

Shanghai
2019 in Chinese motorsport
6 Hours of Shanghai
November 2019 sports events in China